A hexagonal number is a figurate number. The nth hexagonal number hn is the number of distinct dots in a pattern of dots consisting of the outlines of regular hexagons with sides up to n dots, when the hexagons are overlaid so that they share one vertex.

The formula for the nth hexagonal number

The first few hexagonal numbers  are:

1, 6, 15, 28, 45, 66, 91, 120, 153, 190, 231, 276, 325, 378, 435, 496, 561, 630, 703, 780, 861, 946...

Every hexagonal number is a triangular number, but only every other triangular number (the 1st, 3rd, 5th, 7th, etc.) is a hexagonal number. Like a triangular number, the digital root in base 10 of a hexagonal number can only be 1, 3, 6, or 9. The digital root pattern, repeating every nine terms, is "1 6 6 1 9 3 1 3 9".

Every even perfect number is hexagonal, given by the formula 

where Mp is a Mersenne prime. No odd perfect numbers are known, hence all known perfect numbers are hexagonal.
For example, the 2nd hexagonal number is 2×3 = 6; the 4th is 4×7 = 28; the 16th is 16×31 = 496; and the 64th is 64×127 = 8128.

The largest number that cannot be written as a sum of at most four hexagonal numbers is 130. Adrien-Marie Legendre proved in 1830 that any integer greater than 1791 can be expressed in this way.

Hexagonal numbers should not be confused with centered hexagonal numbers, which model the standard packaging of Vienna sausages. To avoid ambiguity, hexagonal numbers are sometimes called "cornered hexagonal numbers".

Test for hexagonal numbers
One can efficiently test whether a positive integer x is a hexagonal number by computing

If n is an integer, then x is the nth hexagonal number. If n is not an integer, then x is not hexagonal.

Congruence relations

Other properties

Expression using sigma notation
The nth number of the hexagonal sequence can also be expressed by using sigma notation as

where the empty sum is taken to be 0.

Sum of the reciprocal hexagonal numbers

Multiplying the index
Using rearrangement , The next set of formulas is given:

Ratio relation
Using the final formula from before with respect to m and then n , and then some reducing and moving , one can get to the following equation:

 for n>0 has  divisors.

Hexagonal square numbers

The sequence of numbers that are both hexagonal and perfect squares starts 1, 1225, 1413721,... .

See also
Centered hexagonal number

External links
 

Figurate numbers